Francesco Carabelli was an Italian sculptor of 18th century Milan.

He was born in Castel San Pietro near Mendrisio in 1737. He first trained with his father, then moved to study in Milan where he lived from there on. His model of the Madonna and Child was chosen for the Cathedral of Monza.

Sources

18th-century Italian sculptors
Italian male sculptors
18th-century Italian male artists